Ramco Systems Limited (MSE–RSST) is an Indian multinational enterprise software company that offers Aviation, ERP, HRP and 
Logistics software. Founded in 1997, it is a part of the Ramco Group and operates in 28 locations across 35 countries. It is headquartered in Chennai, Tamil Nadu, India. The company offers cloud, mobile, chatbot and voice-ready ERP, HR, Global Payroll, Logistics, EAM and Aviation M&E MRO software.

History 
Ramco Systems was founded in 1992 as the research and development division of Ramco Industries and began product development in 1993. It became a separate subsidiary in 1997. In 1997, the company launched its ERP product, Marshal 3.0.

In 2002, Ramco launched VirtualWorks, a web-based ERP product.

In 2018, the company made a deal with Papillon Grand Canyon Helicopters to install Ramco Aviation Suite V5.8 for maintenance and engineering operations of its fleet. The company will also provide services to another Papillon Grand Canyon entity, Grand Canyon Scenic Airlines.

See also
List of ERP vendors                   
SAP ERP

References

External links
 

Information technology companies of India
Customer relationship management software companies
ERP software companies
Companies based in Chennai
Software companies established in 1992
Indian brands
1992 establishments in Tamil Nadu
Companies listed on the National Stock Exchange of India
Companies listed on the Bombay Stock Exchange